The 1999–2000 Miami Hurricanes men's basketball team represented the University of Miami during the 1999–2000 NCAA Division I men's basketball season. 

The University of Miami men's basketball team, led by head coach Leonard Hamilton, played their home games at the Miami Arena as members of the Big East Conference. They finished the season 23–11, 13–3 in Big East play to finish in a tie for first place. They lost in the semifinals of the Big East tournament to St. John's, but received an at-large invitation to the NCAA tournament as No. 6 seed in the South region. Miami defeated Arkansas and No. 3 seed Ohio State to reach the first Sweet Sixteen in program history. In the regional semifinal round, the Hurricanes lost to the Golden Hurricane of Tulsa, 80–71.

Roster

Schedule

|-
!colspan=12 style=| Non-conference regular season

|-
!colspan=12 style=| Big East tournament

|-
!colspan=12 style=| NCAA tournament

Rankings

References

Miami Hurricanes men's basketball seasons
Miami Hurricanes
Miami Hurricanes men's basketball team
Miami Hurricanes men's basketball team
Miami Hurricanes